is a Prefectural Natural Park in Yamagata Prefecture, Japan. Established in 1948, the park lies within the municipalities of Sakata and Tsuruoka. The park's central feature is the eponymous Shōnai coastline.

See also
 National Parks of Japan
 Shōnai Domain

References

External links
  Shōnai Kaihin Prefectural Natural Park (maps) 

Parks and gardens in Yamagata Prefecture
Sakata, Yamagata
Tsuruoka, Yamagata
Protected areas established in 1948
1948 establishments in Japan